Margaret Bandele Olayinka(born 14 September 1958), popularly known as Iya Gbonkan, is a Nigerian veteran actress, who is predominantly known for her scary facial expression.

Career 
Iya Gbonkan stars mostly as a mean witch in Yoruba movies; this is aided by her natural physique. She hit the spotlight in the early 1970s when she featured on Pa Yemi Elebu'bon a television series by Ifa Olokun and also in Olori Emere and in Yekinni Ajileye's Koto Orun.

References

Yoruba actresses
Actresses in Yoruba cinema
Living people
1958 births
Place of birth missing (living people)
Nigerian television actresses
20th-century Nigerian actresses
21st-century Nigerian actresses
Nigerian film actresses